Inuvik Region was a former Statistics Canada census division, one of two in the Northwest Territories, Canada. It was abolished in the 2011 census, along with the other census division of Fort Smith Region, and the land area of the Northwest Territories was divided into new census divisions named Region 1, Region 2, Region 3, Region 4, Region 5, Region 6.

It is not to be confused with the modern-day Inuvik Region administrative region, which is smaller. The administrative region coincides territorially with modern-day census division Region 1; the census division included all of the modern-day Region 1 as well as a part of Region 2. For example, the border of the former Inuvik and Fort Smith census divisions ran through the middle of Great Bear Lake, but the lake is entirely outside of the Inuvik administrative region. The communities of Norman Wells, Colville Lake and Fort Good Hope were part of the census division, but not the administrative region.

It comprised the northern and western part of the Northwest Territories, with its main economic centre in the town of Inuvik. This represented about 23 percent of the population and about 46 percent of the land area of the Northwest Territories.

Census Division communities
Towns
Inuvik
Norman Wells
Hamlets
Aklavik
Fort McPherson
Holman (Ulukhaktok)
Sachs Harbour
Tuktoyaktuk
Tulita
Chartered communities
Deline
Tsiigehtchic
Settlements
Colville Lake
Fort Good Hope
Paulatuk

References

Inuvik Region
Census divisions of the Canadian territories